WKT may refer to:

 Well-known text representation of coordinate reference systems, a text markup language for representing coordinate reference systems
 Well-known text representation of geometry, a text markup language for representing vector geometry objects
 WKT (sealant), a marine sealant
 West Kowloon Terminus, a railway station in Hong Kong